Medwin is a surname. Notable people with the surname include:

 Albert Medwin (1925–2020), American electrical engineer
 Cameron Medwin (born 1982), Canadian soccer player
 Michael Medwin (born 1923), English actor and film producer
 Terry Medwin (born 1932), Welsh international footballer
 Thomas Medwin (1788–1869), English poet and translator

Fictional characters 

 Arthur Medwin, a character in the British soap-opera Coronation Street

See also
Medwyn (disambiguation)
Midewin (disambiguation)

Surnames
English-language surnames
Surnames of British Isles origin
Surnames of English origin
Surnames of Welsh origin